William Edward Roehnelt (June 4, 1936 – July 1968) was an American football linebacker in the National Football League for the Chicago Bears and the Washington Redskins; and in the American Football League for the Denver Broncos.  He played college football at Bradley University.

See also
Other American Football League players

1936 births
1968 deaths
American football linebackers
Chicago Bears players
Washington Redskins players
Denver Broncos (AFL) players
Sportspeople from Peoria, Illinois
Players of American football from Illinois